Hatchet man (or similar) may refer to:

Films
 The Hatchet Man, a 1932 film
 The Nature of the Beast (1995 film), UK title Hatchet Man

Others
 Hatchet man (idiom), a slang term for someone who was brought in to a situation to perform distasteful tasks
 Towards the end of the 19th century, the phrase was used to describe a Chinese assassin who carried a hatchet, which originated from New York's Doyers Street
 The logo of independent label Psychopathic Records, a stylized silhouette of a running man wielding a meat cleaver